Suresh Garimella is an Indian-American mechanical engineer and academic administrator. Since July 1, 2019, Garimella has served as the president of the University of Vermont.

Education 
Garimella earned a Bachelor of Science degree from the Indian Institute of Technology Madras, a Master of Science degree from Ohio State University, and a PhD from University of California, Berkeley; all in mechanical engineering.

Career 
Prior to his appointment, Garimella was the Executive Vice President for Research and Partnerships and the Goodson Distinguished Professor of Mechanical Engineering at the Purdue University College of Engineering.

In 2018, Garimella was appointed as a member of the National Science Board by the Trump Administration. He was named a Jefferson Science Fellow by the United States Department of State in 2010. He has also served as a Science Advisor in the International Energy Agency.

References

Presidents of the University of Vermont
Living people
Indian mechanical engineers
Year of birth missing (living people)
Purdue University faculty
IIT Madras alumni
Ohio State University College of Engineering alumni
UC Berkeley College of Engineering alumni
American mechanical engineers
21st-century Indian engineers
21st-century American engineers
21st-century American academics